Padre Garcia, officially the Municipality of Padre Garcia,  is a 2nd class municipality in the province of Batangas, Philippines. According to the 2020 census, it has a population of 51,853 people.

Padre Garcia's old name is Lumang Bayan, as it is the former seat of government of the neighboring town of Rosario. The name of the town is derived from one of its most famous sons, Padre Vicente Garcia, a native of Barangay Maugat. He was one of the first defenders of Jose Rizal's Noli Me Tangere. He and Rizal were friends during the time when they were fighting for the Philippines' independence from Spain.

It is bounded on the north and northwest by Lipa City; east by San Antonio, Quezon; and south and southwest by Rosario.

History
The town was originally part of Rosario and known as Lumang Bayan or Sambat. It became a separate municipality in 1949 through Executive Order 279 by President Elpidio Quirino, with Jose A. Pesigan and Rustico K. Recto as first elected mayor and vice mayor respectively.

In 1952, the town council founded the cattle market or bakahan. This was in direct competition to the established livestock market of neighbouring Rosario, which resulted in rivalry, intimidation, and violence at times. But the market succeeded and developed into the biggest auction market in Southern Tagalog. Cattle trade happens during every Friday of the week.

Geography

According to the Philippine Statistics Authority, the municipality has a land area of  constituting  of the  total area of Batangas.

Barangays
Padre Garcia is politically subdivided into 18 barangays.

Climate

Demographics

In the 2020 census, Padre Garcia had a population of 51,853.

Economy

Gallery

References

External links

 
[ Philippine Standard Geographic Code]

Municipalities of Batangas
Establishments by Philippine executive order